Grodzicki (feminine: Grodzicka; plural: Grodziccy) is a Polish surname. Notable people with this surname include:

 Johnny Grodzicki (1917–1998), American baseball player
 Krzysztof Grodzicki (died 1659), Polish general
 Rafał Grodzicki (born 1983), Polish footballer
 Stanisław Grodzicki (1912–1946), Polish fighter pilot
 Stefan Grodzicki (1947–1976), Polish equestrian

See also
 

Polish-language surnames